"Dandi dansa" is a song by Swedish singer Danny Saucedo. It was performed in Melodifestivalen 2021 and made it to the final on 13 March, where it ended 7th place with 74 points. It is Saucedo's first Swedish Top 10 hit in half a decade.

Charts

References

2021 songs
2021 singles
Danny Saucedo songs
Melodifestivalen songs of 2021
Songs written by Danny Saucedo